The 2008 Open de Suède Vårgårda – team time trial was the first team time trial running on the Open de Suède Vårgårda.

Race
Top Girls-Fassa Bortolo-Raxy Line was the first of the thirteen teams to set off due to its lowly position on the World Cup overall standings. The team returned with a time of 44:27.5, giving the others something to aim at. Third team to start, Norway, caught its Scandinavian rival Finland in the closing stages to take more than a minute off the Top Girls time with 43:13.7. The first really fast time was posted by the Vrienden Van Het Platteland team, pushing it closer to the 40 minute mark with 40:52.9. The very next team, Flexpoint pushed it still lower though with 40:26.4. Despite being outstanding favourites, the Cervelo-Lifeforce team was – because of its position in the World Cup standings – fourth from last to go. The team blitzed around the course knocking all but a minute and a half off the Flexpoint time with an incredible 38:26.7. The last two teams to go – Equipe Nürnberger Versicherung and Columbia – were the only ones who looked capable of besting the Cervelo-Lifeforce time, but although they were both faster than Flexpoint, neither were able to come within a minute of the Swiss team. Equipe Nürnberger Versicherung finished three seconds quicker than flexpoint to take a provisional second place, but Columbia were consistently faster all the way around and pushed them into third.

General standings (top 10)

Results from cqranking.com.

References

External links
 Official website

2008 in women's road cycling
2008 in Swedish sport
2008 UCI Women's Road World Cup
Open de Suède Vårgårda